Zbigniew Wawer (17 March 1956 – 12 December 2022) was a Polish historian, specializing in Polish Armed Forces in the West military history in World War II. He was the author of several books, articles, and documentaries.

Wawer died on 12 December 2022, at the age of 66.

Works
Monte Cassino. Walki 2 Korpusu Polskiego. Wydawnictwo Bellona S.A., Warszawa 2009, s. 424. 
Od Buzułuku do Monte Cassino. ZP Grupa Sp. z o.o.. s. 160. 
Tobruk 1941. Bellona, 2011. s. 200.

References

Sources
Ukazało się "Monte Cassino. Walki 2 Korpusu Polskiego" Zbigniewa Wawra
"Monte Cassino. Walki 2 Korpusu Polskiego" - Zbigniew Wawer
"Czerwone maki...". Recenzja książki: Zbigniew Wawer, Monte Cassino. Walki 2 Korpusu Polskiego
Zbigniew Wawer - filmografia

1956 births
2022 deaths
21st-century Polish historians
Polish male non-fiction writers
Writers from Warsaw
University of Warsaw alumni
Officers Crosses of the Order of Merit of the Federal Republic of Germany